It's Not What You Know (also known as Chris Tarrant's It's Not What You Know) is a game show hosted by Chris Tarrant, which aired on the British digital TV channel Challenge from 28 April to 6 June 2008.

Gameplay

Phase one
The game is played by a team of two (friends, relatives, etc.). To start, each team is given three games to play, labelled A, B or C. To help them, one celebrity "expert" and their specialist subject from each game is displayed. The players must choose one of the games and, once they have, the other four celebrities and their specialist subjects in the chosen game are revealed. Each game contains 15 questions with each question being specific to one of the celebrity's specialist subject.

Questions and answers
The first question comes up with four possible answers; these answers are shown to all but the specialist celebrity. After the correct answer is displayed (the players' answer are not recorded), the players then decide on which celebrity was "stumped" (got the question incorrect; there were at least four occasions of the specialist celebrity being stumped). Once the players have chosen, their chosen celebrity gets "locked in". After that stage, the celebrities who got the question correct and those were stumped are identified. Following, the players' chosen celebrities are identified; if the celebrity chosen was one of the non-specialist celebrities and were stumped, the players’ jackpot increases to £1,000. If they were the specialist celebrity and were stumped, the players progress up a level with a potential for winning higher amounts of money and the studio changes colour (level 1 is purple, level 2 is yellow, level 3 is blue, level 4 is green and level 5 is left unknown because no couple has reached that point in the game).

The players who chosen the stumped specialist celebrity then play for £5,000. Subsequent correct guesses by the players will increase to £10,000, then £15,000, then to the maximum £25,000.

Back to zero
If the players make an incorrect guess (meaning that their chosen celebrity, specialist or non-specialist, got the question right), they lose what they have accumulated so far. They will still be allowed to continue playing at their current prize level, restarting their jackpot from zero. However, if they make an incorrect guess twice in a row, they'll go down a level (unless they are still on the first level).

Passing
If at any point the players are uncertain of correctly guessing a stumped celebrity, they can pass on the question they are on and keep their winnings safe (they are only allowed to pass on a question once, though), but they cannot pass on Question 15 (the last question) because "that would be too easy", stated by Chris Tarrant.

Final phase
The players then get offered between 20% and 50% of how much they had amassed in the game after Question 14. If the players accept the offer, they'll take home with them the amount of money offered and still go on to Question 15, just to see what would have happened. If the players reject the offer, they'll go on to Question 15 and try to make a correct guess. If they select a stumped celebrity, their jackpot goes up by £1,000, £5,000, £10,000, £15,000 or £25,000 (depending on which ever level they were on) and the players take home with them whatever they have banked. If they select a celebrity who answered the question correctly, they'll leave empty-handed.

Celebrity Experts

Johnny Ball
Michael Buerk
Garry Bushell
Kelly Cates
Sarah Cawood
Giles Coren
Dougie Donnelly
Mark Eccleston
Jenni Falconer
Frederick Forsyth
Neil Fox
Muriel Gray
Ian Hyland
Joe Inglis
Dr Hilary Jones
Miranda Krestovnikoff
Carol McGiffin
Lawrence McGinty
Ray Mears
Brian Moore
Marc Morris
Nina Myskow
Nicholas Owen
Brian Paddick
John Parrott
Prof. Colin Pillinger
Ingrid Seward
Brian Sewell
Brian Turner
Reggie Yates
Tim Yeo

External links

2000s British game shows
2008 British television series debuts
2008 British television series endings
Television series by ITV Studios
Television shows set in London